Genocide definitions include many scholarly and international legal definitions of genocide, a word coined with genos (Greek: "birth", "kind", or "race") and an English suffix -cide by Raphael Lemkin in 1944; however, the precise etymology of the word is a compound of the ancient Greek word γένος ("birth", "genus", or "kind") or Latin word gēns ("tribe", or "clan") and the Latin word caedō ("cut", or "kill"). While there are various definitions of the term, almost all international bodies of law officially adjudicate the crime of genocide pursuant to the Convention on the Prevention and Punishment of the Crime of Genocide (CPPCG).

This and other definitions are generally regarded by the majority of genocide scholars to have an "intent to destroy" as a requirement for any act to be labelled genocide; there is also growing agreement on the inclusion of the physical destruction criterion. Writing in 1998, Kurt Jonassohn and Karin Björnson stated that the CPPCG was a legal instrument resulting from a diplomatic compromise; the wording of the treaty is not intended to be a definition suitable as a research tool, and although it is used for this purpose, as it has an international legal credibility that others lack, other definitions have also been postulated. Jonassohn and Björnson go on to say that for various reasons, none of these alternative definitions have gained widespread support.

List of definitions

See also
 Outline of Genocide studies

Notes

Bibliography 

 
 
 
 
 
 
 
 
 
 
 
 
 
 
  A collection of genocide definitions by the Aegis Trust
 
 
 
 

Crimes
Genocide
Murder